Parotocinclus nandae is a species of catfish in the family Loricariidae. It is native to South America, where it occurs in the Paraguaçu River basin in Bahia, Brazil. The species was described in 2020 by Pablo Lehmann A., Priscila Camelier, and Angela Zanata and is distinguished by its congeners by its unique color pattern and differences in several morphological characteristics. The species reaches at least 4.62 cm (1.8 inches) SL. Females of this species are noted to have thick and rough skin in the interradial membrane of the pelvic fin, a trait which has not been reported from any other member of the order Siluriformes.

References 

Loricariidae
Fish described in 2020
Catfish of South America